Xerez Deportivo Fútbol Club, also known as Xerez DFC, is a football club in Jerez de la Frontera. It was founded in 2013 by a group of fans due to the critical situation of Xerez CD. It plays in the Segunda División RFEF – Group 4, holding home matches at the Estadio Municipal de Chapín, with an overall 20,742-seat capacity. The team colours are usually blue shirts and socks, with white shorts.

History

In June 2013, Joaquín Morales, chairman of Xerez CD, announced he was going to liquidate the club for economic reasons (the club had been in debt for years). A group of fans met and decided to form a new club to replace the old one, and on 28 June the new club, Xerez Deportivo FC, was inaugurated. Morales consequently decided to sell Xerez CD to Ricardo García, a businessman who had considered liquidating another city club, Jerez Industrial CF.

On 17 July 2013, the Salvemos al Xerez (Save Xerez) group held a special session, the Asamblea Xerecista (Assembly of Xerecistas), with club supporters voting to decide the question: "Está usted de acuerdo en que el Xerez Deportivo FC comience a competir en la temporada 2013/14?" (Do you agree that Xerez Deportivo FC should play in the 2013–14 season?) The vote resulted in a 75.79% majority voting 'yes' (for: 689; against: 201; abstentions: 10), and the new club started to play in the eighth national league.

With Sixto de la Calle as provisional president in its first season, the club. Retrieved 5,865 subscribers, a record for a non-professional club. On 30 December 2013, José Ravelo was elected its new president. On 6 April 2014, Deportivo FC was promoted to the seventh national league and won 3–1 against CD Guadiaro.

In the summer of 2014, the assembly voted to create a futsal and a track team, and the club came to terms with the SD Jerez 93 futsal team and the Club Atletismo Chapín track team to include both as part of Xerez Deportivo FC.

The following season, the club acquired 4,102 subscribers and was able to attract players from higher categories. In early 2015, the board of directors decided to democratize the club and allow all members to attend assemblies and elect the president. On 22 February 2015, Xerez Deportivo FC was promoted to the sixth national league and won 6–0 against Espera CF. On 25 May 2015, Carlos Orúe resigned as coach due to disagreements with Pedro Ruiz (responsible for sports affairs) and some of the players. He was replaced by Daniel Pendín.

On 7 July 2015, it was disclosed that Xerez CD and Xerez Deportivo FC were negotiating to combine both clubs into one single club. The board of directors decided to convene an assembly on 23 July to make a decision. On 23 July, the Assembly met in Alcazar of Jerez de la Frontera, where over 350 partners of Xerez Deportivo FC decided for the "Unification of xerecismo" (for: 317; against: 39; abstentions: 7). But finally the "Unification of xerecismo" was not carried out, because Xerez CD fans voted "no" (for: 0; against: 56; abstentions: 11).

On 17 August, the assembly decided to create a rugby team. Xerez Deportivo FC and Club Rugby Xerez, a rugby team founded in 1992, came to an collaboration agreement, so Club Rugby Xerez became a sports club. Early in September, most of Xerez DFC fans showed their discomfort with their board of directors and the Ayuntamiento de Jerez due to use of the Estadio Municipal de Chapín.

At the start of the new season, the club continued getting good results. In 2016 on Easter Sunday, Xerez Deportivo FC was promoted to the fifth national league and won 2–0 against Puerto Real CF. On 25 May, the Asamblea de Socios approved reaching an agreement with Estella CD to be the reserve team of Xerez DFC. In summer 2016, the club ended the affiliation contract with the "Atletismo Chapin" and "CRUXE" Rugby teams.

The following season, the club acquired 3,300 subscribers. In the beginning, the team didn't get good results and the coach, Dani Pendín, was relegated and replaced by Antonio Sanchez Franzon, who turned the results around. Pedro Ruiz, responsible for sports affairs, continued in the club despite complaints from the club's partners. Juan Carlos Ramírez was appointed Sports Director.

In 2018 they promoted to Tercera División.

In the 2018–19 season the team debuts in national category in a very disputed competition. As a historical fact, the first exit out of Andalusia takes place, in a visit to Ceuta in which the "azulinos" impose 0–3 against the AD Ceuta FC in the Alfonso Murube Stadium.

In the 2020–2021 season, in a competition with two stages due to the COVID-19 pandemic, the team earns the promotion to the newly created Segunda Division RFEF

Stadium
Estadio Municipal de Chapín is a multi-purpose stadium in Jerez, Spain, currently used mostly for football matches. It is the home ground of Xerez Deportivo FC. Built in 1988, the stadium holds 20,523 spectators.

In 2002 the stadium was remodeled to accommodate the 2002 FEI World Equestrian Games, the entire grandstand being covered with a roof; a hotel, spa, and gym were added to the complex as well.

Since its foundation in 1988 until 2015, it was the home ground of Xerez CD and since 2013, it's the home ground of Xerez Deportivo FC.

Symbols

Shield

The first official shield was exactly the same as the old coat of arms of the city of Jerez de la Frontera. It is surrounded by a circle with the name Xerez Deportivo FC and there is a ball in the middle.
In 2018 after a consultation among the partners, it was decided to make a choice to choose a new shield. The process consisted of a voting between different alternatives; finally after three polls, Xerez changed its shield.

Anthem
 La voz de un pueblo

Motto
Spanish
"Soy xerecista, seré fiel a mi escudo, blanquiazul es mi sangre y mi grito de guerra será: ¡XEREZ!"

English
"I am xerecista, I will be faithful to my shield, blue and white is my blood and my war cry will be: XEREZ!"

Seasons

Season to season

Detailed list of seasons

Records
 Biggest win: Xerez DFC 9–0 CF Español de Vejer (2014–15 season) and Xerez DFC 9–0 Balón de Cádiz CF (2015–16 season)
 Biggest defeat: CD San Roque de Lepe 5–1 Xerez DFC (2019–20 season) and Xerez DFC 1–5 Cordoba CF (2021–22 season)

Associates

Sports brand and Sponsors

Fundación Xerecismo en Libertad
On 23 March 2015, the president and the secretary of Xerez founded Fundación Xerecismo en Libertad, an organisation dedicated to protecting the interests of Xerez Deportivo FC.

Área Social
Xerez Deportivo supports various charitable causes to promote a better society in the city. Its volunteers work to improve animal welfare, operate soup kitchens, donate blood, and collect toys and food for the needy, among other such activities.

Current squad

Presidents

Coaches

Supporters

Fans
In the first season (2013–14), the club. Retrieved 5,865 subscribers, a record for a non-professional club. The next year, in the 2014–15 season, the club. Retrieved 4,102 subscribers.

The General Assembly is formed by all subscribers older than 18 years of age. It is responsible for voting every four years for the board and president of the club. Also each year they gather for the Extraordinary General Meeting where the annual accounts and the financial budget for the following year as well as other important issues are approved.

Ultras

Kolectivo Sur is the ultras group of Xerez Deportivo FC. It was created in 1991 and it is located in Fondo Sur.

Sympathy

The main team with which Xerez has a sympathetic relationship is Sevilla FC. Good relations between the fans of Xerez DFC and Sevilla FC are born of their ultras groups, Biris Norte of Sevilla and Kolectivo Sur of Xerez, since the late 20th century due to similarity in the political ideology of both groups, as well as the proximity and characteristics of their cities.

See also
Xerez FC
Xerez DFC Fútbol Sala

References

External links 

 
Fútbol Regional profile 

2013 establishments in Andalusia
Association football clubs established in 2013
Football clubs in Andalusia
Divisiones Regionales de Fútbol clubs
Sport in Jerez de la Frontera